Coronation Mountain is a summit in Banff National Park, Alberta, Canada.

Coronation Mountain was named in commemoration of the coronation of King Edward VII and Queen Alexandra.

References

Three-thousanders of Alberta
Alberta's Rockies
Mountains of Banff National Park